Peter Charles Howard Jones (19 August 1948 – 22 December 2017) is a former cricketer, born in Southern Rhodesia (today Zimbabwe), who played for Oxford University in 1971–72 during his education there. He played 26 first class matches against various county sides and the touring Australian side in England for the 1972 Ashes.

Notes

External links
 
 

1948 births
Zimbabwean emigrants to the United Kingdom
Oxford University cricketers
Alumni of St Edmund Hall, Oxford
Living people
Oxford and Cambridge Universities cricketers
English cricketers